Elizabeth Bennett (1714-1791) was a British stage actress. For twenty six years she was part of the regular company of Drury Lane under David Garrick specialising in portraying maids, gossips, and mistresses.

Selected roles
 Lady Loverule in The Devil to Pay (1741)
 Nerissa in The Merchant of Venice (1745)
 Plautia in Virginia (1754)

References

Bibliography
 Highfill, Philip H, Burnim, Kalman A. & Langhans, Edward A. A Biographical Dictionary of Actors, Actresses, Musicians, Dancers, Managers, and Other Stage Personnel in London, 1660-1800: Volume VIII. SIU Press, 1973.
 The Plays of David Garrick: Volume II, 1767-1775. SIU Press, 1980.

18th-century English people
English stage actresses
British stage actresses
18th-century English actresses
18th-century British actresses
1714 births
1791 deaths